East Bangor is a borough in Northampton County, Pennsylvania. The population of East Bangor was 1,124 as of the 2020 census. It is located in the Lehigh Valley metropolitan region, which had a population of 861,899 and was the 68th most populous metropolitan area in the U.S. as of the 2020 census.

Geography
East Bangor is located at  (40.879848, -75.184934).

Transportation

Pennsylvania Route 512 is the only numbered highway serving East Bangor. It follows Central Avenue along a southwest-northeast alignment through the center of the borough.

Demographics

As of the census of 2000, there were 979 people, 387 households, and 261 families residing in the borough. The population density was 1,304.1 people per square mile (504.0/km2). There were 417 housing units at an average density of 555.5 per square mile (214.7/km2). The racial makeup of the borough was 98.98% White, 0.20% African American, 0.10% Native American, 0.20% from other races, and 0.51% from two or more races. Hispanic or Latino of any race were 0.51% of the population.

There were 387 households, out of which 32.8% had children under the age of 18 living with them, 49.6% were married couples living together, 12.4% had a female householder with no husband present, and 32.3% were non-families. 25.6% of all households were made up of individuals, and 9.6% had someone living alone who was 65 years of age or older. The average household size was 2.53 and the average family size was 3.03.

In the borough, the population was spread out, with 24.8% under the age of 18, 9.3% from 18 to 24, 30.2% from 25 to 44, 22.6% from 45 to 64, and 13.1% who were 65 years of age or older. The median age was 36 years. For every 100 females there were 97.8 males. For every 100 females age 18 and over, there were 96.3 males. The median income for a household in the borough was $36,429, and the median income for a family was $42,386. Males had a median income of $31,958 versus $22,188 for females. The per capita income for the borough was $20,056. About 7.3% of families and 10.6% of the population were below the poverty line, including 12.8% of those under age 18 and 9.2% of those age 65 or over.

Public education
The borough is served by the Bangor Area School District. Students in grades nine through 12 attend Bangor Area High School in Bangor.

References

External links

1850 establishments in Pennsylvania
Boroughs in Northampton County, Pennsylvania
Boroughs in Pennsylvania
Populated places established in 1850